"I Fell in Love" is a song co-written and recorded by American country music artist Carlene Carter.  It was released in May 1990 as the first single and title track from her album I Fell in Love.  The song reached number 3 on the Billboard Hot Country Singles & Tracks chart in October 1990.  It was written by Carter, Howie Epstein, Benmont Tench, and Perry Lamek.

Chart performance

Year-end charts

References

1990 singles
Carlene Carter songs
Songs written by Benmont Tench
Songs written by Howie Epstein
Song recordings produced by Howie Epstein
Songs written by Carlene Carter
Reprise Records singles
1990 songs